Full Count Baseball is a 1984 video game published by Lance Haffner Games.

Gameplay
Full Count Baseball is a game in which players may run statistics-based baseball games as a simulations, or create teams for league play.

Reception
Lew Fisher and Eric Faust reviewed the game for Computer Gaming World, and stated that "FC is first rate, by far the best game in Haffner's line of sports games."

David M. Wilson and Johnny L. Wilson reviewed the game for Computer Gaming World, and stated that "this text-heavy statistics-based baseball simulation offers extremely accurate replays."

Duane E. Widner reviewed the game for Computer Gaming World, and stated that "One nice feature is the ability to input your own players and teams. This capability, combined with one's own baseball encyclopedia, allows a player to program virtually anyone that has ever picked up a bat (including his minor league seasons)."

References

External links
Review in Compute!
Review in Supercommodore 64/128
Review in Compute!'s Gazette

1984 video games
Apple II games
Baseball video games
Commodore 64 games
Simulation video games
Video games developed in the United States